Madonnas and Men is a 1920 American silent drama film directed by B.A. Rolfe and starring Anders Randolf, Edmund Lowe and Gustav von Seyffertitz.

Cast
 Anders Randolf as Turnerius / Marshall Turner 
 Edmund Lowe as Gordion / Gordon Turner 
 Gustav von Seyffertitz as Grimaldo / John Grimm 
 Raye Dean as Laurentia / Laura Grimm 
 Evan Burroughs Fontaine as Nerissa / Ninon 
 Blanche Davenport as Mrs. Grimm 
 Faire Binney as Patsy

References

Bibliography
 Langman, Larry. American Film Cycles: The Silent Era. Greenwood Publishing, 1998.

External links

1920 films
1920 drama films
Silent American drama films
Films directed by B. A. Rolfe
American silent feature films
1920s English-language films
American black-and-white films
1920s American films
Films set in ancient Rome
Silent historical films